The Liga Uruguaya de Football Amateur was a football tournament held in Uruguay between 1932 and 1925, that separated the 10 clubs that turned professional from the rest of the teams that remained amateur. The League contained three main divisions: Primera (amateur), Intermedia and Extra. In addition, it was also made up of neighborhood and interior leagues.

It was organized by the Liga Uruguaya de Football Amateur, entity dissident of the Uruguayan Football Association (AUF).

The teams that formed the First Division in 1932 were Misiones (displaced from the Professional League despite having finished in 6th place in the 1931 Uruguayan Primera_División), Cerro, Colón (1931 Divisional Intermedia champion), Deportivo Juventud, Fénix, Intrépido Belgrano, Lito, Liverpool, Maroñas, Progreso, Universitario and Uruguay Montevideo.

The Liga Amateur lasted until 1936, when the entire structure was annexed again together with the Professional League. The Uruguayan Primera División is maintained, the Primera División Amateur becomes the new Divisional Intermedia and the Divisional Extra is created, which merges the Divisional Intermedia and Divisional Extra of the Liga Amateur.

List of champions 
Liga Uruguaya de Football Amateur tournaments are not recognized by the Uruguayan Football Association.

Primera División

Divisional Intermedia

Divisional Extra

See also 
 Uruguayan Football Federation
 Uruguayan Primera División (AUF)

References 

1932 establishments in Uruguay
Recurring sporting events established in 1932